Orlando Gregorio Peña Guevara (born November 17, 1933) is a Cuban former professional baseball pitcher.

Baseball career
Peña was one of many Cuban players who entered the Cincinnati Redlegs' minor league system in the mid-1950s when the National League club affiliated with the Havana Sugar Kings of the Triple-A International League. After four successful years in the Florida State, Carolina and International leagues, he was recalled by Cincinnati in August 1958 and was the winning pitcher in his MLB debut on August 24. Coming into a game against the Los Angeles Dodgers in relief in the eighth inning with the Redlegs trailing 5–4, he held the Dodgers to one hit and no runs and struck out three in two full innings of work. When Cincinnati's Frank Robinson hit a two-run home run in the ninth inning, Peña emerged as the winning hurler. He also earned the first three saves of his MLB career before the 1958 campaign ended.

But his effectiveness declined, and he would bounce between Triple-A and the majors for the next three seasons. Acquired by the Kansas City Athletics in August 1962, Peña was plugged into the second-division team's starting rotation and won six of ten decisions, posted a solid 3.01 earned run average and threw six complete games, including a three-hit shutout against the Angels on August 29.

In , Peña registered a career-high eight saves for the Tigers and Indians with an earned run average of 3.59, but Cleveland sent him back to the minors in 1968 and Peña would not return to the majors until June 1970 when he signed as a free agent with the Pirates. Working out of the Pittsburgh bullpen, he was successful for his first month with club, but rocky outings during August ruined his Pirate tenure and he was released August 26. The 37-year-old Peña was not ready to retire, however. He was mediocre in two trials for the Orioles, but, upon being acquired by the Cardinals on June 15, 1973, he became a key part of the Redbirds' bullpen, appearing in 84 games and notching nine wins and seven saves with a 2.36 ERA before being sent to his final MLB destination, the Angels, in September 1974. The Angels released him the following May, but Peña continued pitching in the minors for the next two seasons, and made an abbreviated comeback at age 45 with the Miami Amigos in the 1979 Triple-A Inter-American League. His professional pitching career in organized baseball encompassed 22 years.

In all or parts of 14 major league seasons, Peña posted a 56–77 record with 818 strikeouts and a 3.71 ERA in 427 games pitched, including 93 starts, 21 complete games, four shutouts, 40 saves, and 1,202 innings pitched.

After his playing retirement, Peña was a scout for the Tigers and Chicago White Sox.

See also
1960 Caribbean Baseball World Series
1970 Caribbean Baseball World Series
List of Major League Baseball players from Cuba

References

External links

Orlando Pena at SABR (Baseball BioProject)
Orlando Pena at Baseballbiography.com
Orlando Pena at Pura Pelota (Venezuelan Professional Baseball League)

1933 births
Living people
Almendares (baseball) players
Baltimore Orioles players
California Angels players
Chicago White Sox scouts
Cincinnati Redlegs players
Cincinnati Reds players
Cleveland Indians players
Cuban expatriate baseball players in the United States
Daytona Beach Islanders players
Detroit Tigers players
Detroit Tigers scouts
Havana Sugar Kings players
High Point-Thomasville Hi-Toms players
Jersey City Jerseys players
Kansas City Athletics players
Leones del Caracas players
Major League Baseball pitchers
Major League Baseball players from Cuba
Miami Amigos players
Miami Orioles players
Navegantes del Magallanes players
Cuban expatriate baseball players in Venezuela
Omaha Royals players
People from Las Tunas (city)
Pittsburgh Pirates players
Portland Beavers players
Rochester Red Wings players
St. Louis Cardinals players
Seattle Angels players
Tiburones de La Guaira players
Toronto Maple Leafs (International League) players
Tucson Toros players